The RIT Tigers represented the Rochester Institute of Technology in College Hockey America during the 2015-16 NCAA Division I women's ice hockey season.

Standings

Offseason
June 26: 2015 graduate and team captain Celeste Brown signed with the New York Riveters of the NWHL to become the first RIT player to sign a professional contract with the league.

Recruiting

Roster

2015–16 Tigers

Schedule

|-
!colspan=12 style=| Regular Season

|-
!colspan=12 style=| CHA Tournament

Awards and honors
 Reagan Rust  CHA Rookie of the Month, November, 2015

 Jetta Rackleff  CHA Goaltender of the Month, December, 2015

 Jenna de Jonge  CHA Rookie of the Month, February, 2016

 Reagan Rust, Defender  CHA All-Rookie Team,

References

RIT
RIT Tigers women's ice hockey seasons
Sports in Rochester, New York